Mustafa Al-Mashadani (born June 8, 1992), better known as Almushi, is an Iraqi-Swedish actor, comedian and writer.

Early life
Born and raised in Baghdad, Iraq, Al-Mashadani moved to Malmö, Sweden at the age of five with both of his parents. He has trained boxing since an early age and was trained by Swedish legendary boxing coach Dallas. Always been a fan of comedy, growing up his influences included Eddie Murphy, Jamie Foxx, and Jim Carrey. Almushi currently resides in Malmö, Sweden.

Career
Almushi began writing and producing comedy skits in 2014. He quickly roses to national fame in Sweden once he began uploading his skits on Facebook. His signature style consists of various imitations as well as exaggerating stereotypes. In an interview with Skånska Dagbladet he revealed that he uses personal experiences from the multicultural Malmö when he makes his sketches.

On August 3, 2014, he became the brand ambassador for Swedish dairy company Skånemejerier

In March 2015, Almushi produced several comedy sketch shows on Swedish Radio Humorhimlen. It was announced in October 2015 that Almushi is in development of Swedish satirical television series. Almushi plans to star in the series, playing various roles. He has also expressed interest in acting in films. He has also began experimenting with stand-up.

As of December 2015, he has over 100,000 followers on social media and is one of Sweden's fastest growing comedians.

References

1992 births
Living people
Swedish male actors
Swedish male comedians
Swedish satirists
Male television writers
Swedish people of Iraqi descent
21st-century Swedish comedians